The WBR Sessions by Guster was released in 2003, and contains 4 songs from Keep It Together that had been rerecorded as acoustic.

Track listing
 "Amsterdam" (acoustic) - 3:43
 "Ramona" (acoustic) - 3:10
 "Jesus on the Radio" (acoustic) - 2:27
 "Careful" (acoustic) - 3:51

2003 EPs
Guster albums